MV Graemsay is a small passenger ferry operated by Orkney Ferries.

History
MV Graemsay was built by Ailsa Shipbuilding Company, Troon in 1996.
Has been extended by 4.5m

Service
MV Graemsay is normally allocated to the South Isles - Graemsay & North of Hoy Service.

References

1996 ships
Transport in Orkney
Ferries of Scotland